Gypsy Camp Meadows, Thrandeston is a  biological Site of Special Scientific Interest north of Thrandeston in Suffolk.

These wet meadows on poorly drained boulder clay have a rich variety of flora, and drainage ditches, areas of drier grassland and hedges add to the diversity. Plants include early purple orchid, ragged robin, zig-zag clover and water avens.

The site is private land with no public access.

References

Sites of Special Scientific Interest in Suffolk